Dual-sector education is a system of tertiary education that includes substantial amounts of both vocational (skills-based) and higher (academic-based) education in the same institution.

It differs from, and/or can also encompass, the similarly termed dual education system – which combines both vocational education within a school and an apprenticeship within a workplace. For instance, Australia's Centralian College offers dual-sector education to students in years 11 and 12 as well as post-school vocational education and training students.

Moodie distinguishes between single-sector institutions which offer 97 per cent of their teaching in one sector, mixed sector institutions which teach from 3 to 20 per cent of their students in their smaller sector, and dual-sector institutions which have substantial (greater than 20 per cent of their load) in each of vocational and higher education. For some institutions, dual-sector education, could  include practical traineeship such as educational internship, field experience, and a pre-graduation internship.

Dual-sector education are offered in the so-called dual-sector institutions, which define it as "further" (post-school, but not necessarily higher level) as well as "higher" education. In Australia, these institutions note markedly different proportions of domestic students to bachelor programmes on the basis of previous studies in vocational education and training. Dual-sector education is offered by colleges and universities worldwide, most prominently in Australia, Austria, Germany, Ireland, New Zealand, Switzerland, and the United Kingdom.

References

Footnotes

Bibliography

 
  Draft of a chapter in 
 

Technical and further education
Vocational education